Renegade Press was an American comic book company, founded by Canadian Deni Loubert, that operated from 1984 to 1988. Notable titles published by Renegade included Flaming Carrot, Ms. Tree, and normalman.

History
Loubert was publisher of Aardvark-Vanaheim until she and husband Dave Sim (owner and major contributor to Aardvark-Vanaheim) divorced, at which point she started Renegade and moved to the United States. With the move, all of Aardvark-Vanaheim's titles (with the exception of Cerebus) left that publisher to continue with Renegade. These included Flaming Carrot Comics, normalman, Neil the Horse, and Ms. Tree.

Although Renegade started in high-profile fashion, its titles suffered from low print runs. In early 1988, Renegade refit its publishing strategy, but suspended all publications later that year. In July 1989 the publisher was shut down for good.

Titles
 Agent Unknown
 Amusing Stories
 3-D Zone Pack Vol. 2 (#6–10)
 3-D Zone Set
 Barefootz
 Cases of Sherlock Holmes (1986–1989), #1–15 (moved to Northstar Publications)
 Cecil Kunkle Vol. 1 (1986)
 Ditko's World Featuring...Static (actually Revolver #7–9)
 Eternity Smith (#1–5, then moved to Hero Comics)
 Flaming Carrot (1985) (#6–17)
 French Ice
 Friends
 Gene Day's Black Zeppelin
 Holiday Out
 Howard Cruse's Barefootz: The Comix Book Stories
 Kafka
 Kilgore
 Love Fantasy
 Manimal
 Maxwell Mouse Follies
 Mechthings
 Ms. Tree
 Ms. Tree 3-D
 Ms. Tree Rock & Roll Summer Special
 Murder (actually Revolver #10–12)
 Neil the Horse
 normalman (1985) (#9–12, 3-D Annual #1)
 Open Season (moved to Strawberry Jam Comics)
 Phony Pages
 Renegade Romance
 Revolver
 Robot Comics
 Roscoe The Dawg, Ace Detective
 Shadows from the Grave
 The Silent Invasion (moved to Caliber Comics)
 Spiral Cage
 Starbikers
 Starbinders
 Strata
 Suburban Nightmares
 T-Minus-1
 Tony Bravado: Trouble-Shooter
 Trypto The Acid Dog
 Valentino
 Vicki Valentine
 Wimmen's Comix #11–13
 Wordsmith (moved to Caliber Comics)

References 

 
Defunct comics and manga publishing companies
Publishing companies established in 1984